The 1932 Purdue Boilermakers football team was an American football team that represented Purdue University during the 1932 Big Ten Conference football season.  In their third season under head coach Noble Kizer, the Boilermakers compiled a 7–0–1 record, finished as a co-champion in the Big Ten Conference with a 5–0–1 record against conference opponents, and outscored opponents by a total of 164 to 42.

End Paul Moss was a consensus first-team selection on the 1932 All-America team.  In addition, fullback Roy Horstmann received first-team honors from the All-America Board, Newspaper Enterprise Association, International News Service, The New York Times, and Walter Camp Football Foundation.

Eight Purdue players received honors on the 1932 All-Big Ten Conference football team: Moss (AP-1; UP-1); Horstmann (AP-1; UP-1); quarterback Paul Pardonner (AP-2); halfbacks Duane Purvis (AP-2, UP-2) and
Fred Hecker (UP-2); tackle Dutch Fehring (UP-2); guard John Letsinger (AP-2, UP-2); and center John Oehler (AP-2, UP-1).

Schedule

References

Purdue
Purdue Boilermakers football seasons
Big Ten Conference football champion seasons
College football undefeated seasons
Purdue Boilermakers football